Abdul Razzaque Rahimoon is a Pakistani politician who has been a member of the Provincial Assembly of Sindh since August 2018 and represents Tharparkar.

Political career
He was elected to the Provincial Assembly of Sindh as a candidate of National Alliance from Constituency PS-63 (Tharparkar-IV) in 2002 Pakistani general election. He received 31,015 votes and defeated Muhammad Iqbal Rahimoon, a candidate of Pakistan Peoples Party (PPP).

He was re-elected to the Provincial Assembly of Sindh as a candidate of Pakistan Muslim League (Q) (PML-Q) from Constituency PS-63 (Tharparkar-IV) in 2008 Pakistani general election. He received 65,151 votes and defeated Dost Muhammad Rahimoon.

He was re-elected to the Provincial Assembly of Sindh as a candidate of Grand Democratic Alliance (GDA) from Constituency PS-54 (Tharparkar-I) in 2018 Pakistani general election.

References

Living people
Grand Democratic Alliance MPAs (Sindh)
Sindh MPAs 2002–2007
Sindh MPAs 2018–2023
Sindh MPAs 2008–2013
Year of birth missing (living people)
Tharparkar District